Alex Bruce White (born August 29, 1988) is an American former professional baseball pitcher. He played in Major League Baseball (MLB) for the Cleveland Indians and the Colorado Rockies.

Amateur career
White attended D.H. Conley High School in his hometown of Greenville, North Carolina and won two state championships with the team. After his senior year of high school, he attended the University of North Carolina, where he played college baseball for the North Carolina Tar Heels. In 2007 and 2008, he played collegiate summer baseball with the Chatham A's of the Cape Cod Baseball League.

Professional career

Cleveland Indians

White was drafted by the Cleveland Indians in the first round of the 2009 Major League Baseball Draft out of North Carolina. He was considered one of the top prospects in baseball.

White made his major league debut on April 30, 2011 against the Detroit Tigers. He'd continue on for 2 more starts, going 1–0 in 15 innings.

Colorado Rockies
On July 30, 2011, White was traded to the Colorado Rockies with Drew Pomeranz, Matt McBride, and minor leaguer Joe Gardner for Ubaldo Jiménez. With the Rockies, White did not enjoy his half season of 2011 with Colorado, as his ERA sat at 8.42 in 7 starts, he also surrender 12 home runs in just 36.1 innings.

On September 10, 2012, White hit his first career home run off Ryan Vogelsong of the San Francisco Giants. In 23 games (20 starts) for the Rockies, White finished the season with a record of 2–9 in 98 innings.

Houston Astros
On December 4, 2012, White was traded to the Houston Astros with minor leaguer Alex Gillingham for Wilton López and a player to be named later or cash from the Astros. The player was later named as outfielder Jose Monzon.

On April 11, 2013, White underwent Tommy John surgery causing him to miss the rest of the 2013 season.

On April 7, 2015, White was designated for assignment. White was released by the team on June 8, 2015.

Atlanta Braves
4 days after his release from the Houston organization, White signed a minor league deal with the Atlanta Braves. White was released by the AAA Gwinnett Braves on July 19, 2015.

Sioux City Explorers
On May 4, 2017, White signed with the Sioux City Explorers of the American Association. He was released on August 1, 2017.

Southern Maryland Blue Crabs
On June 16, 2018, White signed with the Southern Maryland Blue Crabs of the Atlantic League of Professional Baseball. He was released on June 29, 2018.

Personal life
White was arrested for suspicion of driving under the influence of alcohol in March 2012.

References

External links

North Carolina Tar Heels bio

1988 births
Living people
Sportspeople from Greenville, North Carolina
Baseball players from North Carolina
Major League Baseball pitchers
Cleveland Indians players
Colorado Rockies players
North Carolina Tar Heels baseball players
Chatham Anglers players
Kinston Indians players
Akron Aeros players
Columbus Clippers players
Tulsa Drillers players
Colorado Springs Sky Sox players
Oklahoma City RedHawks players
Fresno Grizzlies players
Gwinnett Braves players
Sioux City Explorers players
Southern Maryland Blue Crabs players